Atanas Dzhambazki (born 4 April 1969) is a Bulgarian football manager and former player.

Coaching career
In 2009 Dzhambazki became manager of Montana, after their former manager Stevica Kuzmanovski was released.  He was in charge of the team for two years and managed to stabilize the team and ensure their place in A PFG which was a huge success for Montana.
On 2 June 2011 he decided to leave the club, stating "I have other plans for my future". He spent a brief period as manager of Botev Vratsa and Litex. On 6 June 2012 he was appointed as head coach of Montana for the third time in his career. On 26 May 2015, Dzhambazki was confirmed as the new manager of Botev Vratsa. On 4 October 2016, Dzhambazki was appointed as interim manager of Montana. He resigned on 17 April 2017, following a 3–4 home defeat by Slavia Sofia.  On 3 May 2017, he was appointed as manager of Third League club Kariana Erden.

In August 2018, Dzhambazki was banned for one year and fined 1,500 levs after an incident in a game against Strumska Slava in which he attacked the referee and his assistant.

References

1969 births
Living people
Footballers from Sofia
Bulgarian footballers
Bulgarian football managers
PFC Litex Lovech managers
PFC Slavia Sofia managers
Association football defenders
FC Montana managers